Tryptamine is an indolamine metabolite of the essential amino acid, tryptophan. The chemical structure is defined by an indole—a fused benzene and pyrrole ring, and a 2-aminoethyl group at the second carbon (third aromatic atom, with the first one being the heterocyclic nitrogen). The structure of tryptamine is a shared feature of certain aminergic neuromodulators including melatonin, serotonin, bufotenin and psychedelic derivatives such as dimethyltryptamine (DMT), psilocybin, psilocin and others.  Tryptamine has been shown to activate trace amine-associated receptors expressed in the mammalian brain, and regulates the activity of dopaminergic, serotonergic and glutamatergic systems.  In the human gut, symbiotic bacteria convert dietary tryptophan to tryptamine, which activates 5-HT4 receptors and regulates gastrointestinal motility. Multiple tryptamine-derived drugs have been developed to treat migraines, while trace amine-associated receptors are being explored as a potential treatment target for neuropsychiatric disorders.

For a list of tryptamine derivatives, see: List of substituted tryptamines.

Natural occurrences 
For a list of plants, fungi and animals containing tryptamines, see List of psychoactive plants and List of naturally occurring tryptamines.

Mammalian brain 
Endogenous levels of tryptamine in the mammalian brain are less than 100ng per gram of tissue.  However, elevated levels of trace amines have been observed in patients with certain neuropsychiatric disorders, such as bipolar depression and schizophrenia.

Mammalian gut microbiome 
Tryptamine is relatively abundant in the gut and feces of humans and rodents. Commensal bacteria, including Ruminococcus gnavus and Clostridium sporogenes in the gastrointestinal tract, possess the enzyme tryptophan decarboxylase, which aids in the conversion of dietary tryptophan to tryptamine. Tryptamine is a ligand for gut epithelial serotonin type 4 (5-HT4) receptors and regulates gastrointestinal electrolyte balance through colonic secretions.

Metabolism

Biosynthesis 
To yield tryptamine in vivo, tryptophan decarboxylase removes the carboxylic acid group on the α-carbon of tryptophan. Synthetic modifications to tryptamine can produce serotonin and melatonin; however, these pathways do not occur naturally as the main pathway for endogenous neurotransmitter synthesis.

Catabolism 
Monoamine oxidases A and B are the primary enzymes involved in tryptamine metabolism to produce indole-3-acetaldehyde, however it is unclear which isoform is specific to tryptamine degradation.

Mechanisms of Action and Biological Effects

Neuromodulation 
Tryptamine can weakly activate the trace amine-associated receptor, TAAR1 (hTAAR1 in humans). Limited studies have considered tryptamine to be a trace neuromodulator capable of regulating the activity of neuronal cell responses without binding to the associated postsynaptic receptors.

hTAAR1 

hTAAR1 is a stimulatory G-protein coupled receptor (GPCR) that is weakly expressed in the intracellular compartment of both pre- and postsynaptic neurons. Tryptamine and other hTAAR1 agonists can increase neuronal firing by inhibiting neurotransmitter recycling through cAMP-dependent phosphorylation of the monoamine reuptake transporter.  This mechanism increases the amount of neurotransmitter in the synaptic cleft, subsequently increasing postsynaptic receptor binding and neuronal activation. Conversely, when hTAAR1 are colocalized with G protein-coupled inwardly-rectifying potassium channels (GIRKs), receptor activation reduces neuronal firing by facilitating membrane hyperpolarization through the efflux of potassium ions. The balance between the inhibitory and excitatory activity of hTAAR1 activation highlights the role of tryptamine in the regulation of neural activity.

Activation of hTAAR1 is under investigation as a novel treatment for depression, addiction, and schizophrenia. hTAAR1 is primarily expressed in brain structures associated with dopamine systems, such as the ventral tegmental area (VTA) and serotonin systems in the dorsal raphe nuclei (DRN). Additionally, the hTAAR1 gene is localized at 6q23.2 on the human chromosome, which is a susceptibility locus for mood disorders and schizophrenia. Activation of TAAR1 suggests a potential novel treatment for neuropsychiatric disorders, as TAAR1 agonists produce anti-depressive activity, increased cognition, reduced stress and anti-addiction effects.

Gastrointestinal Motility 
Tryptamine produced by mutualistic bacteria in the human gut activates serotonin GPCRs ubiquitously expressed along the colonic epithelium. Upon tryptamine binding, the activated 5-HT4 receptor undergoes a conformational change which allows its Gs alpha subunit to exchange GDP for GTP, and its liberation from the 5-HT4 receptor and βγ subunit. GTP-bound Gs activates adenylyl cyclase, which catalyzes the conversion of ATP into cyclic adenosine monophosphate (cAMP). cAMP opens chloride and potassium ion channels to drive colonic electrolyte secretion and promote intestinal motility.

Pharmacodynamics

Tryptamine-Based Therapeutics

See also
Tryptophan
Substituted tryptamines
Trace amines
Serotonin receptor agonist
Human trace amine associated receptor 1
Neuromodulation

References

External links 
 Tryptamine FAQ
 Tryptamine Hallucinogens and Consciousness
 Tryptamind Psychoactives, reference site on tryptamine and other psychoactives.
 Tryptamine (T) entry in TiHKAL • info

 
TAAR1 agonists
Trace amines
Serotonin receptor agonists
Serotonin-norepinephrine-dopamine releasing agents